is a Japanese scholar of political studies and area studies. He is now a professor at Graduate School of International Cooperation Studies, Kobe University, Japan.

Career
Kimura was born in 1966 in Higashiosaka, Osaka Prefecture, Japan. He studied at Kyoto University and received his L.L.D. in 2001 for his first book, Chosen/Kankoku Nashonarizumu to 'Shokoku-Ishiki''' (Korean Nationalism as a Small Nation).

He became a Research Associate at Faculty of Law and Literature of Ehime University in 1993, and taught between 1994 and 1997 as a Lecturer at the same university.

In 1997 he moved to the Graduate School of International Cooperation Studies, Kobe University as an associate professor, and became a full professor in April 2005. He was appointed to the Director of Center for Asian Academic Collaboration at Kobe University in 2017 too.

He was also a Research Fellow of Korea Foundation in 1996-1997, a visiting scholar at Fairbank Center for East Asian Research at Harvard University in 1998-1999, a visiting scholar at Asiatic Research Center of Korea University in 2001, a visiting scholar at Sejong Institute in 2006, and a visiting fellow at Faculty of Asian Studies of the Australian National University in 2008. He was also a visiting scholar of The Henry M. Jackson School of International Studies at University of Washington in Seattle from 2010 to 2011, a visiting professor at Graduate School of International Studies, Korea University in 2014.

At academic societies, he is a vice-president of the Association for Contemporary Korean Studies in Japan, and a director of Japanese Association of Modern East Asian Studies. He was also a director of the Japanese Association for Comparative Politics, research collaborator of the sub-committee on the modern history at the First Japan-Korea Collaborative History Research Committee , which was established by the agreement between Japanese Prime Minister Junichiro Koizumi and South Korean President Kim Dae-jung in 2001. He became a full committee member of the Second Japan-Korea Collaborative History Research Committee, which was established by another agreement of both governments in 2005.

In local societies, he worked as a director of Hyogo International Center from 2006 to 2007, which is under Hyogo Prefectural Government, and successively held various posts of the center from 2001 to 2007. He was also appointed to the president of "the Pan-Pacific Forum", an NPO in Kobe for international cooperation established in the 1980s.

Research

He studied comparative politics and area studies especially of East Asia. His principal interests are in relationships between modernization and ideology. His major research field is Korean Peninsula.

He was awarded the Special Prize of the 13th Asian and Pacific Prize by the Asia Society and Mainichi Shimbun newspaper in 2001 for Chosen/Kankoku Nashonarizumu to 'Shokoku-Ishiki (Korean Nationalism as a Small Nation), the 25th Suntory Academic Prize by the Suntory Foundation in 2003 for Kankoku ni okeru 'Kenishugiteki' Taisei no Seiritsu (Authoritarianization in South Korea), and The Yomiuri Yoshino Sakuzo Prize by Yomiuri Shimbun newspaper and the Chuokoron Shinsha publishing house in 2015 for Nikkan Rekishininshiki Mondai towa Nanika (What the Historical Dispute between Japan and South Korea is).

Books

2000 : Chosen/Kankoku Nashonarizumu to 'Shokoku-Ishiki (Korean Nationalism as a Small Nation) Kyoto: Minerva Shobo, in Japanese, won the 13th Asian and Pacific Prize.
2003 : Kankoku ni okeru 'Kenishugiteki' Taisei no Seiritsu (Authoritarianization in South Korea). Kyoto: Minerva Shobo, in Japanese, won the 25th Suntory Academic Prize.
2004 : Chosen Hanto wo Domiruka (Understanding Korean Peninsula). Tokyo: Shueisya, in Japanese.
2006 : Minshuka to Nashonarizumu no Genchiten (Democratization and Nationalism in the Changing World). co-ed with Yoshifumi Tamada, Kyoto: Minerva Shobo, in Japanese.
2007 : Posuto Kanryu no Media Shakaigaku (Social Studies on Post-Hallyu Trends in Japan and South Korea), co-ed with Saeko Ishita, Chie Yamanaka, Kyoto: Minerva Shobo, in Japanese.
2007 : Koso, Binhi (King Kojong and Queen Min: The Story of The Royal Family of the Chosun Dynasty from 1863 to 1919), Kyoto: Minerva Shobo, in Japanese.
2007 : Joseon/Hangug Naesyeoneorijeom gwa Sogug-euisig (Korean Nationalism as a Small Nation, Korean Version), translated by Kim Saedog, Seoul: Sancheoreom, in Korean.
2008 : Minshuka no Kankoku Seiji: Paku Chonhi to Yato Seijika Tachi (Precondition of Korean Democratization: Park Chung-Hee and the Opposition Leaders from 1961 to 1979), Nagoya: Nagoyadaigaku Shuppankai, in Japanese.
2008 : Kankoku Gendaishi: Daitoryo Tachi no Eiko to Satetsu (History of South Korea: Rise and Fall of the Presidents), Tokyo: Chuokoronshinsha, in Japanese.
2009 : Kindai Kankoku no Nashonarizumu (Modern Nationalism of Korea), Kyoto: Nakanishuya Shuppan, in Japanese.
2009 : Popyurizumu Minshushugi Seijishido (Populism, Democracy and Political Leadership), co-ed with Yukinori Shimada, Kyoto: Minerva Shobo, in Japanese.
2012 : Tettei Kensho Kankokuron no Tsusetsu Zokusetsu (Criticizing Popular Believes on Korea in Japan), co-ed with Yuki Asaba and Daisuke Sato, Tokyo: Chuonkoronshisha, in Japanese.
2014 : Nikkan Rekishininshiki Mondai towa Nanika (What the Historical Dispute between Japan and South Korea is), Kyoto: Minerva Shobo, in Japanese.
2019 : The Burden of the Past: Problems of Historical Perception in Japan-Korea Relations, University of Michigan Press, 2019.
2020 : Rekishi-Ninshiki wa Dokatararete Kitaka (Discoures of Historical Disputes), Tokyo: Chikura Shobo, in Japanese.
2020 : Heiseijidai no Nikkan Kankei (Japan-South Korean Relations in Heisei Period), Kyoto: Minerva Shobo, in Japanese.
2022 : Kankoku Aizo: Gekihensuru Ringoku to Watashi no 30 nen (Korea and I: A Personal Experience of Koreanist in Japan), Tokyo: Chuokoronshinsha, in Japanese.
2022 : Gokaishinai tameno Nikkan Kankei Kogi (A Public Lecture on Japan-Korean Relations), Tokyo: PHP Kenkyusho, in Japanese.

Major Articles in English

2004 : 'A Dangerous Current in Roh's South Korea'. Japan Echo, August 2004, pp. 44–48.
2005 : 'Historical Perceptions and South Korea's Changing Identity'. Japan Echo, October 2005, pp. 11–15.
2006 : 'Why Did the Chosun Dynasty Fail to Modernize?: "Modernization from above" in Korea'. Political Science in Asia Vol.2 No.1, Winter 2006, pp. 115–134
2007 : 'Nationalistic Populism in Democratic Countries of East Asia'. Journal of Korean Politics Vol.16 No.2, October 2007, pp. 277–299
2009 : 'A Populist with Obsolete Ideas: The Failure of Roo Moo-Hyun', Kosuke Mizuno and Pasuk Phongpaichit ed., Populism in Asia , NUS Press, 2009, pp. 167–180
2010 : ‘How can we cope with historical disputes? The Japanese and South Korean experience', Marie Söderberg ed., Changing Power Relations in Northeast Asia '', Rutledge, 2010, pp.19-31
2011 : 'Why Are the Issues of “Historical Perceptions” between Japan and South Korea Persisting?’, "Journal of International Cooperation Studies" Vol.16, No.2, July 2011, pp. 1–28
2012 : 'Discovery of Disputes: Collective Memories on Textbooks and Japanese–South Korean Relations', "Journal of Korean Studies" Vol.17, No.1, Spring 2012, pp. 97–124
2013 : 'On Migration from Japan to Korea', Younghee Cho ed. "Emigration Trends and Policies of Major Sending Countries to Korea", IOM MRTC Special Issues in Migration Series. No. 4. IOM Migration Research and Training Centre. Goyang-si. Republic of Korea., pp. 183–210.
2014 : 'Democracy and diversionary incentives in Japan–South Korea disputes',  co-au with Koji Kagotani and Jeffry Weber, "International Relations of Pacific-AsiaJ" Vol.13, No.2, 2014, pp. 33–58.
2014 : 'Northeast Asian Trilateral Cooperation in the Globalizing World: How to Re-establish the Mutual Importance',  "Journal of International Cooperation Studies" Vol.21, No.2-3, Jan.2014, pp. 41–61.

Education

1990 : LL.B. Faculty of Law, Kyoto University
1992 : LL.M. Graduate School of Law, Kyoto University
2001 : LL.D. Graduate School of Law, Kyoto University

Professional Experience

1993 : Research Associate at Ehime University (till 1994)
1994 : Lecturer at Ehime University (till 1997)
1996 : Research Fellow at Korea Foundation (till 1997)
1997 : Associate Professor at Kobe University (till 2005)
1998 : Visiting Scholar at Harvard University (till 1999)
2001 : Visiting Scholar at Korea University
2005 : Professor at Kobe University (till now)
2006 : Visiting Scholar at Sejong Institute
2008 : Visiting Fellow at Australian National University
2010 : Visiting Scholar at University of Washington (till 2011)
2012 : President of the Pan-Pacific Forum (NPO) (till now)
2014 : Executive Chief Researcher of Asia Pacific Institute of Research (till 2021)
2014 : Visiting Professor at Korea University

See also
Korean studies
Political Studies
List of political scientists

References

External links
  (in Japanese)
Official Home Page by Prof. Kan Kimura
Official Page at the Graduate School of International Cooperation Studies, at Kobe University
Official Page at the Graduate School of International Cooperation Studies of Syllabus of Kan Kimura's Lecture at Kobe University
Why Did the Chosun Dynasty Fail to Modernize? : Another experience of “Modernization from Above” in Korea (Author Version), in Kobe University Repository
"Relationship of Neighboring Countries Within Globalization: Focus on Japan-Korea Relations" (Summary of a lecture at Kokushikan University)
The Politics of History: the Case of Japan and Korea, lecture at The Stanford Korean Studies Program (KSP)

1966 births
Living people
Japanese political scientists
20th-century Japanese historians
Harvard University staff
People from Higashiōsaka
Kyoto University alumni
Academic staff of Kobe University
21st-century Japanese historians